Abdominal pain, also known as a stomach ache, is a symptom associated with both non-serious and serious medical issues.

Common causes of pain in the abdomen include gastroenteritis and irritable bowel syndrome. About 15% of people have a more serious underlying condition such as appendicitis, leaking or ruptured abdominal aortic aneurysm, diverticulitis, or ectopic pregnancy. In a third of cases the exact cause is unclear.

Given that a variety of diseases can cause some form of abdominal pain, a systematic approach to the examination of a person and the formulation of a differential diagnosis remains important.

Differential diagnosis
The most frequent reasons for abdominal pain are gastroenteritis (13%), irritable bowel syndrome (8%), urinary tract problems (5%), inflammation of the stomach (5%) and constipation (5%). In about 30% of cases, the cause is not determined. About 10% of cases have a more serious cause including gallbladder (gallstones or biliary dyskinesia) or pancreas problems (4%), diverticulitis (3%), appendicitis (2%) and cancer (1%). More common in those who are older, ischemic colitis, mesenteric ischemia, and abdominal aortic aneurysms are other serious causes.

Acute abdominal pain
Acute abdomen can be defined as severe, persistent abdominal pain of sudden onset that is likely to require surgical intervention to treat its cause. The pain may frequently be associated with nausea and vomiting, abdominal distention, fever and signs of shock. One of the most common conditions associated with acute abdominal pain is acute appendicitis.

Selected causes
 Traumatic: blunt or perforating trauma to the stomach, bowel, spleen, liver, or kidney
 Inflammatory:
 Infections such as appendicitis, cholecystitis, pancreatitis, pyelonephritis, Peritonitis, pelvic inflammatory disease, hepatitis, mesenteric adenitis, or a subdiaphragmatic abscess
 Perforation of a peptic ulcer, a diverticulum, or the caecum
 Complications of inflammatory bowel disease such as Crohn's disease or ulcerative colitis
 Mechanical:
 Small bowel obstruction secondary to adhesions caused by previous surgeries, intussusception, hernias, benign or malignant neoplasms
 Large bowel obstruction caused by colorectal cancer, inflammatory bowel disease, volvulus, fecal impaction or hernia
 Vascular: occlusive intestinal ischemia, usually caused by thromboembolism of the superior mesenteric artery

By system
A more extensive list includes the following:
 Gastrointestinal
 GI tract
 Inflammatory: gastroenteritis, appendicitis, gastritis, esophagitis, diverticulitis, Crohn's disease, ulcerative colitis, microscopic colitis
 Obstruction: hernia, intussusception, volvulus, post-surgical adhesions, tumors, severe constipation, hemorrhoids
 Vascular: embolism, thrombosis, hemorrhage, sickle cell disease, abdominal angina, blood vessel compression (such as celiac artery compression syndrome), superior mesenteric artery syndrome, postural orthostatic tachycardia syndrome
 Digestive: peptic ulcer, lactose intolerance, celiac disease, food allergies, indigestion
 Glands
 Bile system
 Inflammatory: cholecystitis, cholangitis
 Obstruction: cholelithiasis, tumours
 Liver
 Inflammatory: hepatitis, liver abscess
 Pancreatic
 Inflammatory: pancreatitis
 Renal and urological
 Inflammation: pyelonephritis, bladder infection
 Obstruction: kidney stones, urolithiasis, urinary retention, tumours
 Vascular: left renal vein entrapment
 Gynaecological or obstetric
 Inflammatory: pelvic inflammatory disease
 Mechanical: ovarian torsion
 Endocrinological: menstruation, Mittelschmerz
 Tumors: endometriosis, fibroids, ovarian cyst, ovarian cancer
 Pregnancy: ruptured ectopic pregnancy, threatened abortion
 Abdominal wall
 muscle strain or trauma
 muscular infection
 neurogenic pain: herpes zoster, radiculitis in Lyme disease, abdominal cutaneous nerve entrapment syndrome (ACNES), tabes dorsalis
 Referred pain
 from the thorax: pneumonia, pulmonary embolism, ischemic heart disease, pericarditis
 from the spine: radiculitis
 from the genitals: testicular torsion
 Metabolic disturbance
 uremia, diabetic ketoacidosis, porphyria, C1-esterase inhibitor deficiency, adrenal insufficiency, lead poisoning, black widow spider bite, narcotic withdrawal
 Blood vessels
 aortic dissection, abdominal aortic aneurysm
 Immune system
 sarcoidosis
 vasculitis
 familial Mediterranean fever
 Idiopathic
 irritable bowel syndrome (IBS)(affecting up to 20% of the population, IBS is the most common cause of recurrent and intermittent abdominal pain)

By location 
The location of abdominal pain can provide information about what may be causing the pain. The abdomen can be divided into four regions called quadrants. Locations and associated conditions include:
 Diffuse
 Peritonitis
 Vascular: mesenteric ischemia, ischemic colitis, Henoch-Schonlein purpura, sickle cell disease, systemic lupus erythematosus, polyarteritis nodosa
 Small bowel obstruction
 Irritable bowel syndrome
 Metabolic disorders: ketoacidosis, porphyria, familial Mediterranean fever, adrenal crisis
 Epigastric
 Heart: myocardial infarction, pericarditis
 Stomach: gastritis, stomach ulcer, stomach cancer
 Pancreas: pancreatitis, pancreatic cancer
 Intestinal: duodenal ulcer, diverticulitis, appendicitis
 Right upper quadrant
 Liver: hepatomegaly, fatty liver, hepatitis, liver cancer, abscess
 Gallbladder and biliary tract: inflammation, gallstones, worm infection, cholangitis
 Colon: bowel obstruction, functional disorders, gas accumulation, spasm, inflammation, colon cancer
 Other: pneumonia, Fitz-Hugh-Curtis syndrome
 Left upper quadrant
 Splenomegaly
 Colon: bowel obstruction, functional disorders, gas accumulation, spasm, inflammation, colon cancer
 Peri-umbilical (the area around the umbilicus, aka the belly button)
 Appendicitis
 Pancreatitis
 Inferior myocardial infarction
 Peptic ulcer
 Diabetic ketoacidosis
 Vascular: aortic dissection, aortic rupture
 Bowel: mesenteric ischemia, Celiac disease, inflammation, intestinal spasm, functional disorders, small bowel obstruction
 Lower abdominal pain
 Diarrhea
 Colitis
 Crohn's
 Dysentery
 Hernia
 Right lower quadrant
 Colon: intussusception, bowel obstruction, appendicitis (McBurney's point)
 Renal: kidney stone (nephrolithiasis), pyelonephritis
 Pelvic: cystitis, bladder stone, bladder cancer, pelvic inflammatory disease, pelvic pain syndrome
 Gynecologic: endometriosis, intrauterine pregnancy, ectopic pregnancy, ovarian cyst, ovarian torsion, fibroid (leiomyoma), abscess, ovarian cancer, endometrial cancer
 Left lower quadrant
 Bowel: diverticulitis, sigmoid colon volvulus, bowel obstruction, gas accumulation, Toxic megacolon
 Right low back pain
 Liver: hepatomegaly
 Kidney: kidney stone (nephrolithiasis), complicated urinary tract infection
 Left low back pain
 Spleen
 Kidney: kidney stone (nephrolithiasis), complicated urinary tract infection
 Low back pain
 kidney pain (kidney stone, kidney cancer, hydronephrosis)
 Ureteral stone pain

Pathophysiology 

Abdominal pain can be referred to as visceral pain or peritoneal pain. The contents of the abdomen can be divided into the foregut, midgut, and hindgut. The foregut contains the pharynx, lower respiratory tract, portions of the esophagus, stomach, portions of the duodenum (proximal), liver, biliary tract (including the gallbladder and bile ducts), and the pancreas. The midgut contains portions of the duodenum (distal), cecum, appendix, ascending colon, and first half of the transverse colon. The hindgut contains the distal half of the transverse colon, descending colon, sigmoid colon, rectum, and superior anal canal.

Each subsection of the gut has an associated visceral afferent nerve that transmits sensory information from the viscera to the spinal cord, traveling with the autonomic sympathetic nerves. The visceral sensory information from the gut traveling to the spinal cord, termed the visceral afferent, is non-specific and overlaps with the somatic afferent nerves, which are very specific. Therefore, visceral afferent information traveling to the spinal cord can present in the distribution of the somatic afferent nerve; this is why appendicitis initially presents with T10 periumbilical pain when it first begins and becomes T12 pain as the abdominal wall peritoneum (which is rich with somatic afferent nerves) is involved.

Diagnosis
A thorough patient history and physical examination is used to better understand the underlying cause of abdominal pain.

The process of gathering a history may include:
 Identifying more information about the chief complaint by eliciting a history of present illness; i.e. a narrative of the current symptoms such as the onset, location, duration, character, aggravating or relieving factors, and temporal nature of the pain. Identifying other possible factors may aid in the diagnosis of the underlying cause of abdominal pain, such as recent travel, recent contact with other ill individuals, and for females, a thorough gynecologic history.
 Learning about the patient's past medical history, focusing on any prior issues or surgical procedures.
 Clarifying the patient's current medication regimen, including prescriptions, over-the-counter medications, and supplements.
 Confirming the patient's drug and food allergies.
 Discussing with the patient any family history of disease processes, focusing on conditions that might resemble the patient's current presentation.
 Discussing with the patient any health-related behaviors (e.g. tobacco use, alcohol consumption, drug use, and sexual activity) that might make certain diagnoses more likely.
 Reviewing the presence of non-abdominal symptoms (e.g., fever, chills, chest pain, shortness of breath, vaginal bleeding) that can further clarify the diagnostic picture.
 Using Carnett's sign to differentiate between visceral pain and pain originating in the muscles of the abdominal wall.

After gathering a thorough history, one should perform a physical exam in order to identify important physical signs that might clarify the diagnosis, including a cardiovascular exam, lung exam, thorough abdominal exam, and for females, a genitourinary exam.

Additional investigations that can aid diagnosis include:
 Blood tests including complete blood count, basic metabolic panel, electrolytes, liver function tests, amylase, lipase, troponin I, and for females, a serum pregnancy test.
 Urinalysis
 Imaging including chest and abdominal X-rays
 Electrocardiogram

If diagnosis remains unclear after history, examination, and basic investigations as above, then more advanced investigations may reveal a diagnosis. Such tests include:
 Computed tomography of the abdomen/pelvis
 Abdominal or pelvic ultrasound
 Endoscopy and/or colonoscopy

Management
The management of abdominal pain depends on many factors, including the etiology of the pain. In the emergency department, a person presenting with abdominal pain may initially require IV fluids due to decreased intake secondary to abdominal pain and possible emesis or vomiting. Treatment for abdominal pain includes analgesia, such as non-opioid (ketorolac) and opioid medications (morphine, fentanyl). Choice of analgesia is dependent on the cause of the pain, as ketorolac can worsen some intra-abdominal processes. Patients presenting to the emergency department with abdominal pain may receive a "GI cocktail" that includes an antacid (examples include omeprazole, ranitidine, magnesium hydroxide, and calcium chloride) and lidocaine. After addressing pain, there may be a role for antimicrobial treatment in some cases of abdominal pain. Butylscopolamine (Buscopan) is used to treat cramping abdominal pain with some success. Surgical management for causes of abdominal pain includes but is not limited to cholecystectomy, appendectomy, and exploratory laparotomy.

Emergencies 
Below is a brief overview of abdominal pain emergencies.

Epidemiology
Abdominal pain is the reason about 3% of adults see their family physician. Rates of emergency department (ED) visits in the United States for abdominal pain increased 18% from 2006 through to 2011. This was the largest increase out of 20 common conditions seen in the ED. The rate of ED use for nausea and vomiting also increased 18%.

References

External links 

 
Symptoms and signs: Digestive system and abdomen
Acute pain